Songwriter is a studio album by American country singer-songwriter Bill Anderson. It was released via TWI Records in May 2010. The project was co-produced by Bill Anderson and Rex Schnelle. It was Anderson's 42nd studio album in his recording career and contained a total of 12 tracks.

Background and content
Songwriter was originally going to be titled Good Time Gettin' Here, but Anderson changed the name for one reason. "So then I began to think of some songs that I've had that had not been recorded that I was proud of, and the whole thing just evolved. One day I said, 'Why don't we just call it 'Songwriter?' Basically if I'm anything, I guess that's what I am," he recalled in 2010. Anderson co-produced the project with Rex Schnelle. The pair have recorded several studio albums in the past.

The album was a collection of 12 tracks, all of which were written by Anderson. Many of the album's tracks contained collaborations with other artists. The fourth track, "If You Can't Make Money", includes a guitar solo from Brad Paisley. Other collaborations on the project include Jon Randall and Billy Montana.

Release
Songwriter was released in May 2010 on Anderson's own label called TWI Records. It was offered as a compact disc and a music download. The album did not chart on any publication at the time of its release, including Billboard. The final album track, "Thanks to You", was released as a single in 2010 but did not reach any charting positions.

Track listing

Personnel
All credits are adapted from the liner notes of Songwriter.

 Bill Anderson – producer, lead vocals
 Brad Paisley – guitar
 Rex Schnelle – producer

Release history

References

2010 albums
Albums produced by Bill Anderson (singer)
Bill Anderson (singer) albums